A tornado outbreak struck southern and central Poland on 15 August 2008. Overall, it killed four people. Tornadoes affected Opole Voivodeship, Silesian Voivodeship and Łódź Voivodeship. The European Storm Forecast Experiment issued a Level 3 which means there could potentially be a major severe thunderstorm outbreak.



Tornado outbreak 
Multiple supercells formed in southern Poland on the afternoon of August 15, 2008 and produced several significant tornadoes that resulted in many casualties and significant damage. The main tornado-producer was a long-tracked right moving supercell with a BWER and a hook echo visible on radar which formed in southern Poland and moved north-northeastward, spawning several strong tornadoes. The outbreak began when a weak tornado touched down in Knurów causing little damage. While the first tornado was occurring, the main tornado-producer produced its first tornado, a large and violent multiple-vortex that struck the villages of Dolnica, Kopanina, Zimna Wódka, Kolonia Jaryszów, Balcarzowice, Błotnica Strzelecka and Dąbrówka with a total path of 20 km damaging or destroying hundreds of buildings and wounding 15 people, with a width of 500–1000 m before dissipating in a wooded area. It was given a rating of high-end F3/low-end F4. The supercell produced another multiple-vortex tornado near Piłka and struck the northern side of town, causing little damage. Northeast of Rusinowice the tornado quickly became large and destroyed a large swath of forest, its path still clearly visible on satellite imagery today. The tornado then hit the western suburbs of Kalina where it killed 1 person and caused more tree damage before it probably dissipated east of Herby, where the supercell either quickly recycled and produced a new F3 tornado that struck the city of Blachownia, or the same tornado continued into Blachownia. After the tornado that impacted Blachownia dissipated, the supercell produced an F2 tornado struck the town of Mykanów. This tornado flipped a bus while it was crossing a highway, and a video taken by one of the passengers can be seen on YouTube today. At 16:40 UTC the same supercell produced another multiple-vortex and non-fully condensed  F3 which struck the west part of Radomsko, destroying or damaging about 100 houses on a path of about 4–5 km. Four other tornadoes touched down, including another F3 and an F2 before the main tornado-producing supercell decayed. Another F1 tornado touched down in Radom, likely associated with a different supercell, before activity on the 15th ended. The outbreak continued on 16 August, producing two tornadoes, both were F1, one in Osipy Kolonia and one, the strongest (T3), struck Seroczyn damaging 130 buildings.

Confirmed tornadoes 

 Some tornadoes were confirmed but were not rated.

August 15 event

Notable tornadoes

Jaryszów tornado 

The tornado start at 15:00 UTC (17:00 local time) just north-east of Dolnica, cutting down trees and power poles. The multiple-vortex tornado continued its path and struck the village of Kopanina with a width of about 600–700 m causing serious damage to homes. The wedge tornado changed direction pointing to the south side of the city of Zimna Wódka, where 15–20 buildings were damaged or destroyed. The tornado changed direction again and struck Kolonia Jaryszów. There the tornado reached a maximum width of 1000 m and many buildings were damaged or destroyed. On the A4 highway, some cars and trucks were thrown tens of meters away and the trees were debarked. Crossing the highway, the tornado struck Sieroniowice and Balcarzowice where many buildings were almost razed to the ground (F4–T8 damage) and some people were injured. After Balcarzowice the tornado struck Błotnica Strzelecka with a width of about 400–500 m causing severe damage, classifiable as a strong F2 (T5), and finally the tornado struck the forest between Błotnica and Dąbrówka causing F2 sporadic damage and causing damage classifiable as a low F1 (T2). The tornado was classified as an F3 T7, damaging about 150 buildings and injuring 15 people. No one was killed by the storm.

Rusinowice-Kalina-Herby tornado 

The second tornado from the main tornado-producing supercell formed near Piłka and then struck the north side of the town at 15:30 UTC, producing little damage. The tornado continued on to Rusinowice, where it significantly intensified into a strong tornado as it passed through the southern and eastern part of the town, one person was killed when a building collapsed. The tornado continued to quickly intensify and expand as it moved northeast of Rusinowice, where it snapped, uprooted, and debarked hundreds of trees in a forest. The tornado reached its maximum width of at least half a mile north of Ciesnowia, clipping the northern side of town and leveling entire swaths of forest, denuding and debarking hundreds of trees. The tornado then continued moving north-northeast and caused its worst damage in the western suburbs of Kalina, where many homes were leveled. One person lost their life in this area from a falling tree. The tornado then turned to the northeast, producing more tree damage before it is assumed to have dissipated after passing southeast of Herby, where the supercell quickly produced another F3 tornado that struck Blachownia. The parent supercell brought 4 centimetres (1.6 in) hail to some places while the tornado was in progress.

Mykanów tornado 

The tornado struck the town of Mykanów at 16:20 UTC hitting the southern and the eastern part of the town causing damage to some houses, some with the roof torn off. The tornado probably touched down near Topolów or Radostków, but this may have been the same tornado that hit Blachownia causing F3 damage along its path. The storm crossed national road 1 where a bus was turned and lifted into the air injuring the 40 people inside, 10 seriously. The tornado struck Grabowa and Bogusławice causing T4 (F2) damage and low F1 damage in Kruszyna before it dissipated.

Effects 
In total, 4 people were killed and about 770 buildings sustained damage. It was strongest tornado outbreak in Poland in many years. Many downbursts occurred between Slovak Republic and Poland, some with winds up to 140–150 km/h causing severe damage to some towns and 2 deaths in Slovak Republic. Large hail caused injuries and destruction; in Poland the hail reached 8–9 cm but also 10–13 cm in diameter (but this is not confirmed) injuring 10 people and causing severe damage.

See also 
 August 2008 European tornado outbreak

References

External links 
 Scientist article
 BBC news
 Damages in Lubliniec

Poland
Tornado, 2008
Tornado Outbreak
Poland, 2008
Poland, Tornadoes
Tornado outbreak